Middle College High School can refer to several schools in the United States:

Grossmont Middle College High School, El Cajon, California
Hamilton County Middle College High School at Chattanooga State, Tennessee
Middle College for Technology Careers, Houston, Texas
Middle College High School at DTCC, Durham, North Carolina
Middle College High School at GTCC, at three locations in Guilford County, North Carolina
Dr. Wright L. Lassiter Jr. Early College High School, formerly Middle College High School, (Dallas), Texas
Middle College High School at LaGuardia Community College, Long Island City in Queens, New York City
Middle College High School (Los Angeles), California
Middle College High School (San Pablo), California
Middle College High School (Santa Ana), California
Middle College High School (Seattle, Washington)
Middle College High School (Stockton), California
Middle College High School (Tennessee), Memphis, Tennessee
Middle College High School (Franklin, Tennessee), Franklin, Tennessee
Academy of Health Sciences at Prince George's Community College